Jay Nelson Hankins  (November 7, 1935 – January 20, 2020) was a professional baseball player who played two seasons for the Kansas City Athletics of Major League Baseball.

Hankins attended the University of Missouri. He was a member of the Tigers team that won the 1954 College World Series. Hankins was signed as a free agent by the Kansas City Athletics in 1957.

After his playing days were over, Hankins worked both as a minor league manager for the Kansas City Royals organization and as the Scouting Director for the Philadelphia Phillies from 1989 to 1992. He died on January 20, 2020.

References

External links

1935 births
2020 deaths
Albany Senators players
Anaheim Angels scouts
Baseball players from Missouri
California Angels scouts
Cleveland Indians scouts
Columbia Gems players
Hawaii Islanders players
Kansas City Athletics players
Kansas City Royals scouts
Major League Baseball outfielders
Major League Baseball scouting directors
Minor league baseball managers
Missouri Tigers baseball players
Philadelphia Phillies executives
Philadelphia Phillies scouts
Portland Beavers players
Shreveport Sports players
Sportspeople  from St. Louis County, Missouri
American expatriate baseball players in Panama